The  2015 Africa Cup of Nations, known as the Orange Africa Cup of Nations, Equatorial Guinea 2015 for sponsorship reasons, was the 30th staging of the Africa Cup of Nations, the international men's football championship of Africa. It was organized by the Confederation of African Football (CAF) and was held from 17 January to 8 February 2015.

The tournament was initially scheduled to be hosted by Morocco who later demanded postponement of the event because of the Ebola virus epidemic in West Africa; subsequently Morocco was ruled out as a host country and replaced by Equatorial Guinea.

Ivory Coast won the tournament for their second Africa Cup of Nations title, defeating Ghana 9–8 in a penalty shoot-out after the final finished goalless following extra time. The DR Congo came third and the hosts Equatorial Guinea fourth, while defending champions Nigeria did not qualify.

Host selection
Bids:

CAF received 3 bids before 30 September 2010, the deadline, to host either the 2015 or 2017 Africa Cup of Nations from DR Congo, Morocco and South Africa. All three bids were originally put on a shortlist. CAF then began an inspection procedure, on November and December 2010, intending to visit each bidding country to view stadiums, infrastructure, and football interest. They inspected the DR Congo first. Shortly after the inspection, DR Congo informed CAF that they would be withdrawing their bids for both the 2015 and 2017 Africa Cup of Nations tournaments. Morocco was the next country to be inspected, with CAF visiting the country in early November 2010. South Africa was inspected in December 2010.

On 29 January, during the 2011 CAF Super Cup, the CAF Board decided that Morocco would host the 2015 African Cup of Nations, while the 2017 edition would be held in South Africa. The four Morocco host cities which were scheduled to host the tournament were Rabat, Marrakesh, Agadir and Tangier, as announced by the CAF Executive Committee on 23 September 2013. Casablanca would serve as an alternative venue.

Moroccan withdrawal
In October 2014, the government of Morocco requested a postponement of the tournament due to the Ebola virus epidemic in West Africa. After the matter was discussed at the executive committee meeting on 2 November 2014, CAF decided to keep the date of the tournament, while also asking for a clarification from the Royal Moroccan Football Federation of whether they still wish to host the tournament. On 8 November, Morocco failed to meet this deadline to confirm it would host the tournament. Three days later CAF confirmed that Morocco would not host the tournament and a new host would be chosen from a list of countries which have expressed interest. Morocco, who had previously qualified as hosts, were disqualified from participation at the tournament. CAF confirmed legal action against Morocco due to a contract signed in April 2014. Moroccan Sports Minister Mohamed Ouzzine said that CAF had falsely accused his country of "refusing" to host the tournament when it wanted it postponed, and justified the decision by citing that the World Health Organization gives every country the right to protect its citizens. On 6 February 2015, CAF announced that Morocco had been banned from the next two AFCON tournaments, fined 1 million US dollars, as well as demanding 9 million US dollars in compensation. However, the ban was overturned by the Court of Arbitration for Sport, meaning Morocco may enter the tournaments.

Egypt, Ghana, South Africa and Sudan all declined to take over as hosts. Angola, the hosts of the 2010 edition, were spoken of as a potential replacement due to existing stadia and infrastructure in the country. However, a member of the Angolan Football Federation stated that it could not be possible as the new government budget did not include any tournaments.

On 14 November 2014, CAF announced that Equatorial Guinea would host the tournament.

Qualification

Qualification for the tournament were made up of four stages, three preliminary rounds and a final group stage. The 21 best-ranked teams were given a bye to the group stage, while the next 26 teams began play in the second preliminary round, and four lowest ranked teams started at the first round. The three preliminary rounds were a series of playoffs, with the winners advancing.

51 nations entered the tournament (excluding initial hosts Morocco). It was the competitive debut of South Sudan. Djibouti and Somalia declined to enter.

Morocco would have automatically qualified as hosts; however, after their refusal to host, they were expelled from the tournament by the CAF. Equatorial Guinea was chosen as the new host, and despite having played in the qualifiers and been disqualified due to fielding an ineligible player, they qualified for the tournament automatically.

The defending champions Nigeria failed to qualify for the tournament.

Qualified teams
The following sixteen teams qualified for the tournament.

1 Bold indicates champion for that year.
2 Italic indicates host for that year.

Venues

The four Equatorial Guinean cities selected to host the tournament were Malabo, Bata, Mongomo and Ebebiyín.

Malabo and Bata were also host venues for the 2012 Africa Cup of Nations.

Screening for Ebola was given to all spectators attending matches.

Format
Only the hosts got an automatic qualification spot, the other 15 teams qualified through qualification tournament. At the finals, the 16 teams were drawn into four groups of four teams each. The teams in each group played a single round robin. After the group stage, the top two teams from each group advanced to the quarterfinals. The quarterfinal winners advanced to the semifinals. The semifinal losers played in the third place match, while the semifinal winners played in the final.

Draw
The finals draw was held on 3 December 2014 in Malabo. It was initially to be held on 26 November 2014 in Rabat before the change of host country.

The 16 teams were divided into four pots based on the CAF Ranking, with the hosts Equatorial Guinea placed in Pot 1 automatically. The ranking was computed using the teams' results in the 2015 Africa Cup of Nations qualifiers (weighted by 2), 2013 Africa Cup of Nations finals (weighted by 3) and qualifiers (weighted by 1), the 2012 Africa Cup of Nations finals (weighted by 2) and qualifiers (weighted by 0.5), the 2010 Africa Cup of Nations finals (weighted by 1), and the 2014 FIFA World Cup qualifiers.

Match officials
The following referees were chosen for the 2015 Africa Cup of Nations.

Referees

  Mehdi Abid Charef
  Juste Ephrem Zio
  Sidi Alioum
  Noumandiez Doué
  Gehad Grisha
  Bamlak Tessema Weyesa
  Eric Otogo-Castane
  Bakary Gassama
  Joseph Lamptey
  Aboubacar Mario Bangoura
  Hamada Nampiandraza
  Koman Coulibaly
  Ali Lemghaifry
  Rajindraparsad Seechurn
  Bouchaïb El Ahrach
  Malang Diedhiou
  Bernard Camille
  Victor Gomes
  Med Said Kordi
  Janny Sikazwe

Assistant referees

  Albdelhak Etchiali
  Jerson Emiliano Dos Santos
  Jean-Claude Birumushahu
  Oamogetse Godisamang
  Evarist Menkouande
  Yéo Songuifolo
  Hassan Egueh Yacin
  Tahssen Abo El Sadat Bedyer
  Angesom Ogbamariam
  Malik Alidu Salifu
  Aboubacar Doumbouya
  Marwa Range
  Redouane Achik
  Yahaya Mahamadou
  Peter Edibe
  Theogene Ndagijimana
  Djibril Camara
  El Hadji Malick Samba
  Zakhele Siwela
  Ali Waleed Ahmed
  Anouar Hmila

Squads

Each team could register a squad of 23 players.

Group stage
The group winners and runners-up advance to the quarter-finals.

Tiebreakers

The teams are ranked according to points (3 points for a win, 1 point for a draw, 0 points for a loss). If tied on points, tiebreakers are applied in the following order:

 Number of points obtained in games between the teams concerned;
 Goal difference in games between the teams concerned;
 Goals scored in games between the teams concerned;
 If, after applying criteria 1 to 3 to teams concerned, two or three teams still have an equal ranking, criteria 1 to 3 are reapplied exclusively to the matches between these teams in question to determine their final rankings. If this procedure does not lead to a decision, criteria 5 to 7 will apply;
 Goal difference in all games;
 Goals scored in all games;
 Drawing of lots.

Group A

Group B

Group C

Group D

Guinea and Mali finished level on the second spot after the group stage, making the first drawing of lots needed at the tournament since 1988. Unlike some other international tournaments, 2015 Africa Cup of Nations tournament regulations would not use fair-play criteria or a penalty shoot-out after the teams met on the last match day to determine the final group ranking. Both head coaches have openly criticised the regulations.

Knockout stage

In the knockout stages, if a match is level at the end of normal playing time, extra time shall be played (two periods of 15 minutes each) and followed, if necessary, by kicks from the penalty mark to determine the winner, except for the play-off for third place where no extra time shall be played.

On 27 January 2015, the CAF announced that they had relocated the venues of two of the quarter-finals:
 The venue of quarter-final 2 is relocated from Nuevo Estadio de Ebebiyín, Ebebiyín to Estadio de Bata, Bata.
 The venue of quarter-final 3 is relocated from Estadio de Mongomo, Mongomo to Nuevo Estadio de Malabo, Malabo.
The kick-off time of quarter-finals 2 and 4 are also changed from 20:00 to 20:30 local time.

Scores after extra time are indicated by (a.e.t.), and penalty shoot-out are indicated by (pen.).

All times local, WAT (UTC+1).

Quarter-finals

Semi-finals

Third place play-off

Note: no extra-time was played

Final

Statistics

Goalscorers
3 goals

  Thievy Bifouma
  Dieumerci Mbokani
  Javier Balboa
  André Ayew
  Ahmed Akaïchi

2 goals

  Jeremy Bokila
  Christian Atsu
  Wilfried Bony
  Gervinho
  Max Gradel

1 goal

  Nabil Bentaleb
  Faouzi Ghoulam
  Riyad Mahrez
  Islam Slimani
  Hillal Soudani
  Aristide Bancé
  Benjamin Moukandjo
  Ambroise Oyongo
  Héldon
  Férébory Doré
  Fabrice Ondama
  Prince Oniangue
  Yannick Bolasie
  Joël Kimwaki
  Emilio Nsue
  Ibán Edú
  Pierre-Emerick Aubameyang
  Malick Evouna
  Kwesi Appiah
  Jordan Ayew
  John Boye
  Asamoah Gyan
  Mubarak Wakaso
  Kévin Constant
  Ibrahima Traoré
  Mohamed Yattara
  Seydou Doumbia
  Wilfried Kanon
  Yaya Touré
  Bakary Sako
  Modibo Maïga
  Sambou Yatabaré
  Mame Biram Diouf
  Kara Mbodj
  Moussa Sow
  Oupa Manyisa
  Mandla Masango
  Thuso Phala
  Yassine Chikhaoui
  Mohamed Ali Moncer
  Emmanuel Mayuka
  Given Singuluma

1 own goal
  Thulani Hlatshwayo (against Algeria)

Awards
Pepsi Highest Scorer
  André Ayew

Orange Man of the Competition
  Christian Atsu

Best Goalkeeper
  Sylvain Gbohouo

Nissan Goal of the tournament
  Christian Atsu vs Guinea (3rd goal of the match)

Samsung Fair Player of the Tournament
  Kwesi Appiah

Fair Play of the tournament 

CAF Team of the Tournament

Discipline
In the final tournament, a player was suspended for the subsequent match in the competition for either getting red card or accumulating two yellow cards in two different matches. The disciplinary panel has the ability to increase the automatic one match ban for a red card (e.g. for violent conduct). Single yellow card cautions were erased at the conclusion of the group stage, and were not carried over to the knockout stage. The following players were or are suspended during the final tournament – for one or more games – as a result of red cards or yellow card accumulations:

Tournament team rankings
As per statistical convention in football, matches decided in extra time are counted as wins and losses, while matches decided by penalty shoot-outs are counted as draws.

Marketing

Sponsorship
The 2015 Africa Cup of Nations has one title sponsor and seven official sponsors as shown below.

Match ball
The new Adidas Africa Cup Ball is called Adidas Marhaba (meaning Welcome, in Arabic). The Africa Cup 2015 Ball was unveiled 26 November 2014 following the controversy about the host situation for the 2015 Africa Cup of Nations.

Mascot
The official mascot of the tournament was "Chuku Chuku", a porcupine.

Opening ceremony
The opening ceremony of the 2015 Africa Cup of Nations took place on 17 January, at the Estadio de Bata, before the opening match of the tournament between hosts Equatorial Guinea and Congo.

Controversies

Drawing of lots
Guinea and Mali finished with equal records in Group D, thus the drawing of lots was required to choose who would advance into the quarter-finals. Prior to the draw, Mali coach Henri Kasperczak said that the tournament "must find a more sporting way [to decide who advances], fairer...This does not correspond to a sporting spirit". His Guinean counterpart Michel Dussuyer said that neither team deserved to be eliminated in that manner.

Guinea won the draw, causing a complaint from Boubacar Diarra, president of the Malian FA. Issa Haytou, president of CAF, defended the process as the only option.

The CAF Disciplinary Committee's South African President Raymond Hack stated that CAF's Member Associations had chosen the option of picking lots ahead of penalties six months prior. He also said that the "Fair Play [disciplinary] table was to be used but the countries object to that and they said the table must be taken out of the rules. Had the Fair play table been used, Guinea would have qualified ahead of Mali with a better disciplinary record."

Tunisia vs. Equatorial Guinea refereeing

Wadie Jary, the president of the Tunisian Football Federation, claimed that there was a bias against Tunisia following their controversial quarter-final defeat to Equatorial Guinea on 31 January 2015. He was banned from CAF competitions and activities. Rajindraparsad Seechurn, the Mauritian referee who gave a penalty to Equatorial Guinea in that match, was banned from officiating for six months and removed from CAF's elite register of referees. The Tunisian FA was fined $50,000 for confronting the referee during the match, in addition to damage to changing room facilities, while Equatorial Guinea was fined $5,000 for inadequate security at the stadium.

Equatorial Guinea vs. Ghana crowd incidents

During the semi-final fixture between host nation of Equatorial Guinea and Ghana several incidents occurred between the home fans, visiting fans and police. At the half-time break with Ghana leading the game 2–0, the Ghanaian players were protected from hostile Equatoguinean fans by police using plastic shields.

During the 82nd minute in the second half, fans rushed onto the pitch and missiles were thrown at the Ghanaian substitute players. The players moved onto the pitch to escape the missiles. The travelling Ghanaian fans were also targets and took shelter near the goal of the pitch, out of the range of those throwing objects. A helicopter was dispatched and used to disperse spectators out of the stadium by hovering at a low height above them. The Ghanaian FA described the incident as being similar to a "war zone".

Equatorial Guinea's Police force had fired smoke bombs into the stands in an attempt to bring order. The game was stopped for about 30 minutes, before recommencing for a few minutes.

CAF imposed a US$100k fine on the Equatoguinean Football Federation and were informed an 'official match' in Equatorial Guinea must be held 'behind closed doors' after the tournament's completion.

DR Congo defender Gabriel Zakuani stated that he would rather his team forfeit the third-place playoff instead of play in front of Equatorial Guinea's fans, an opinion which was not shared by his manager Florent Ibengé.

References

External links

 Orange Africa Cup Of Nations, Equatorial Guinea 2015, CAFonline.com

 
Nations
2015 in Equatoguinean sport
2015
International association football competitions hosted by Equatorial Guinea
January 2015 sports events in Africa
February 2015 sports events in Africa